Strictly Ballroom is a 1992 Australian romantic comedy film directed and co-written by Baz Luhrmann in his feature directorial debut. The film is the first in his "Red Curtain Trilogy" of theatre-motif-related films; it was followed by 1996's Romeo + Juliet and 2001's Moulin Rouge!

Strictly Ballroom is based on a critically acclaimed stage play, originally set up in 1984 by Luhrmann and fellow students during his studies at the National Institute of Dramatic Arts in Sydney. An expanded version of the play became a success at the Czechoslovakian Youth Drama Festival in Bratislava in 1986. In 1988, it had a successful season at Sydney's Wharf Theatre, where it was seen by Australian music executive Ted Albert and his wife Antoinette. They both loved it, and, when Albert, soon after, set up the film production company M&A Productions with ex-Film Australia producer Tristram Miall, they offered Luhrmann their plan to transform his play into a film. He agreed on the condition that he would also get to direct it.

Plot
Scott Hastings, the frustrated son of a family of ballroom dancers, has been training since the age of six. His mother Shirley teaches ballroom dancing, and his father Doug meekly handles maintenance chores at the dance studio, while secretly watching old footage of his bygone dance competitions as well as Scott's in a back room. Scott struggles to establish his personal style of dance to win the Pan-Pacific Grand Prix Dancing Championship, but his innovative and flashy "crowd-pleasing" steps are not considered "strictly ballroom", and as such are denounced by Australian Dancing Federation head Barry Fife.

Scott and his dancing partner Liz Holt lose the Southern Districts Waratah Championships due to Scott dancing his own steps. Three days later, Liz leaves him to team up with Ken Railings, the recent Waratah Championships winner; his partner Pam Short has broken both her legs in a car accident. With Scott now alone only three weeks until the championships, Shirley teams up with his coach Les Kendall, her co-instructor at the studio, to start desperately hunting for a new partner for him. Meanwhile, unbeknownst to both, Scott is approached by Fran, an overlooked "beginner" dancer at the studio. He eventually agrees to partner with her, intrigued by her willingness to dance "his way".

The pairing faces its first hurdle when Fife, attempting to prevent Scott from threatening the Dancesport status quo, arranges for his partnership with established Champion dancer Tina Sparkle. When Shirley and Les hear the news, they are overjoyed. Fran, happening upon them exclaiming over their happiness about Scott's new dance partner, misunderstands initially and believes they have discovered that she and Scott have become partners. When she realises the truth, she leaves, devastated. Scott pursues her and, although she is hurt, entices her to dance backstage with him, and her anger is forgotten. However, several onlookers witness their dance, including Shirley and Les, who then do everything possible to persuade both Scott and Fran that the best way forward for all concerned is for Scott to forget about Fran and sign on as Tina Sparkle's partner.

Fran, accused of damaging Scott's chances, reluctantly accedes and returns home crestfallen. Scott tells his mother he won't dance with Tina. He follows Fran home, where her overprotective Spanish father, Rico, discovers and challenges him. To appease Rico, Scott proposes a Paso Doble for the assembled company. Rico and Fran's grandmother Ya Ya demonstrate the proper Paso Doble technique and offer to teach the couple, who spend the next week training with Fran's family. However, Fife intervenes, telling Scott that Doug (his father) ruined his own career by dancing his own steps, which he has regretted ever since. Unwilling to upset his parents further, Scott re-teams with Liz.

During the competition, Doug explains to Scott that Fife lied: Fife had convinced Shirley to dance with Les instead of Doug so that Fife could win the competition. It is also revealed that Fife is plotting to sabotage Scott in favor of audience favorite, Ken. Scott runs after Fran and persuades her to dance with him.

In the next round, Scott and Fran make a dramatic entrance and begin dancing, immediately riveting the audience. Fife tries to disqualify them, but Scott's friend Wayne Burns, having overheard Fife's treachery along with his partner Vanessa Cronin, disconnects the PA system, allowing Scott and Fran to dance a Paso Doble routine that impresses the audience. Desperate, Fife tries to turn off the music, but Scott's younger sister Kylie and her partner Luke interfere until Fife's girlfriend Charm Leachman disconnects the sound system. Fife then disqualifies Scott and Fran, but Doug begins clapping out a beat to enable the pair to continue dancing. The audience claps along, as Scott and Fran resume dancing. Liz, having had a change of heart, turns on Fife and Leachman and restores the music, and Scott and Fran's spirited dancing brings down the house. Doug asks Shirley to dance with him and the whole audience joins them on the floor. As the performance finishes, Scott and Fran kiss, the competition forgotten.

Cast
 Paul Mercurio as Scott Hastings
 Tara Morice as Fran (Francisca)
 Bill Hunter as Barry Fife
 Pat Thomson as Shirley Hastings, Scott's mother
 Gia Carides as Liz Holt
 Peter Whitford as Les Kendall, Scott's coach
 Barry Otto as Doug Hastings, Scott's father and Shirley's husband
 John Hannan as Ken Railings
 Sonia Kruger as Tina Sparkle
 Kris McQuade as Charm Leachman, Barry's girlfriend
 Pip Mushin as Wayne Burns, Scott's best friend
 Leonie Page as Vanessa Cronin, Wayne's partner and fiancé and Liz's best friend
 Antonio Vargas as Rico, Fran's father
 Armonia Benedito as Ya Ya, Fran's grandmother
 Jack Webster as Terry Best
 Michael Burgess as Merv
 Lauren Hewett as Kylie Hastings, Scott's sister
 Steve Grace as Luke, Kylie's dance partner
 Kerry Shrimpton as Pam Short

Production history
The film version of Strictly Ballroom was developed from an original short play of the same name. It drew on Luhrmann's own life experience—he had studied ballroom dancing as a child and his mother worked as a ballroom dance teacher in his teens and inspired by the life of Keith Bain (who grew up in the same town as Luhrmann). While studying at NIDA in the early 1980s, Luhrmann and a group of fellow students devised a short comedy-drama set in the cutthroat world of competitive ballroom dancing. This original 1984 NIDA production was a critical success and, after graduating, Luhrmann was invited to re-stage the play for the Czechoslovakian Youth Drama Festival in Bratislava in 1986. He invited his school friend Craig Pearce to help him rewrite and expand the script. With its themes of artistic repression and underdogs battling against the odds, the play was a success at the festival, winning both the best director and best production awards.

This led Luhrmann to direct more theatre productions back in Australia, and in 1988, as part of the Australian Bicentenary celebrations, the Sydney Theatre Company invited him to establish an experimental theatre ensemble, Six Years Old, which took up a residency at The Wharf Theatre for that year. Alongside Luhrmann and Pearce, the new company included one of the original NIDA collaborators, actor Catherine McClements, plus production designer Catherine Martin (whom Luhrmann subsequently married), set dresser Bill Marron and costume designer Angus Strathie, all of whom went on to collaborate with Luhrmann on his films. The group work-shopped the expanded version of play, which had a trial season at the Brisbane Expo in 1988 before opening at the Wharf Studios on 24 September 1988.

During its successful run at the Wharf, the play was seen by an influential Australian music executive. Ted Albert was a leading record producer and music publisher, best known in Australia as the discoverer and original producer of 1960s pop sensations The Easybeats. By the time he saw Strictly Ballroom, Albert was the managing director of his family-owned music publishing company Albert Music (formerly J. Albert & Sons) and its subsidiary, the highly successful record label Albert Productions, which scored a string of hits in the 1970s and 1980s with acts including John Paul Young and AC/DC.

Albert's wife Antoinette (known as "Popsy") took him to see the play after seeing a newspaper ad; they loved the energy, colour and musicality of the play and Ted Albert immediately saw the potential to develop the play into a film using the musical resources available to him through Alberts' publishing and recording enterprises. Soon after, Ted set up the film production company M&A Productions with ex-Film Australia producer Tristram Miall; they tracked Luhrmann down through NIDA and approached him with the offer to transform his play into a movie. In its early stages, with the involvement of writer Andrew Bovell, the script took a more serious tone, including a subplot set around the trade union at the BHP steelworks in the industrial city of Newcastle. Luhrmann balked at the move towards naturalism and eventually, with Albert's agreement, the director brought in his old friend Craig Pearce, who was able to translate Luhrmann's theatrical vision into a workable screenplay.

The producers had difficulty in securing funding for the project, which mostly featured a cast of newcomers. The only "bankable names" in the cast were Barry Otto and screen veteran Bill Hunter, and although co-star Paul Mercurio was well known as a dancer through his work with the Sydney Dance Company, Strictly Ballroom was his first acting role. With the original budget set at over AUD 5 million, government film funding bodies were reluctant to back such a left-field project with few major names in the credits. The script was then pared back and the subplot dropped, but when Miall approached the Film Finance Corporation, he was told that they would not back such a high-budget film (in Australian terms) with a first-time director. He was told to replace Luhrmann, but he refused, promising to make further cuts. Miall and Albert then pared the budget down to AUD 3.3 million and the FFA then agreed to provide around 65%, on condition that the producers were able to raise the remaining AUD 1 million and secure a local distributor. They sent Luhrmann to the Cannes Film Festival in hopes of finding an overseas distributor, but this came to nothing. After returning to Australia, Miall and Luhrmann had a fortuitous meeting with Andrew Pike, head of the Canberra-based independent distribution company Ronin Films. Intrigued by Luhrmann's colourful pitch which involved sketches, set miniatures and pieces of costume, Pike agreed to back a limited local release, although he later admitted that, had he seen only the script, he would probably have turned it down.

Although the FFC funding was now in the pipeline, the production faced its most serious challenge when, on 11 November 1990, Ted Albert died suddenly from a heart attack (the film is dedicated to him). This threw the entire project into doubt, but Ted Albert's widow Popsy decided that it should go to completion in honour of her husband, so she took over as executive producer, with Miall as producer. With her blessing, Ted's family company Albert Music invested AUD 1 million, with the remaining AUD 300,000 sourced from private investors. Even after completion, the team were greeted with stiff resistance from exhibitors: Luhrmann recalled that one exhibitor walked out before the film had even finished, declaring that Luhrmann was ruined and that he would never work again.

The film was accepted for the Cannes Film Festival, but another tragedy struck just before its first screening—actress Pat Thomson, who played Scott's mother, was diagnosed with cancer and she died in April 1992, only one month before its Cannes world premiere in May. Strictly Ballroom had its first public screening at midnight in the Un Certain Regard programme and proved to be an instant hit—the cast and crew received a fifteen-minute standing ovation, which was repeated the following night; it became one of the major hits of the festival, winning the Prix De Jeunesse and triggering a bidding war among international distributors.

It was a huge success when released in Australia in August, and it swept the field at the 1992 AFI awards, gaining 13 nominations and winning in eight major categories. It was also a major success at the 1993 BAFTA awards, gaining eight nominations and winning three awards for 'Best Costume Design', 'Best Original Film Score' and 'Best Production Design'. Other major accolades included a 1994 Golden Globe nomination for Best Picture, 'Newcomer of the Year' at the 1993 London Critics Circle Film Awards, the 'People's Choice' award at the 1992 Toronto International Film Festival and 'Most Popular Film' at the 1992 Vancouver International Film Festival.

Home video
The film was released on DVD on 19 March 2002 by Buena Vista Home Entertainment.

Reception
Strictly Ballroom holds a rating of 88% on Rotten Tomatoes based on 48 reviews. The website's critical consensus reads, "As emotionally rich as it is eye-catching, Strictly Ballroom uses its infectious energy as the fuel for a modern dance classic with all the right moves." Metacritic, which uses a weighted average, assigned the film a score of 72 out of 100 based on 16 critics, indicating "generally favorable reviews". Not all major critics responded positively, with Australian film critic Adrian Martin calling it “amateurish and badly pitched in many respects“  while American Jonathan Rosenbaum referred to it as “wretched”   and “one of the more horrific and unpleasant movies I’ve seen in quite some time”. 

Marcella Papandrea from The Super Network spoke about Strictly Ballroom in her video series 'The Movies That Make Marcey' that the core message of the film "a life lived in fear is a life half lived" had a huge impact on her life, giving strength and courage to pursue her creative endeavors.

Box office
Strictly Ballroom previewed in Australia the week ending Wednesday, 19 August 1992 on 35 screens, grossing A$204,726 and finishing sixth at the Australian box office for the week. It officially opened on 20 August on 51 screens grossing A$1,216,376 in its opening week, placing at number 2 at the Australian box office, just behind Patriot Games on twice the number of screens. In its second week of release, it reached number one with a gross of A$1,307,825. It was knocked off number one the following week by Lethal Weapon 3 but returned in its sixth week of release after expanding to 85 screens where it remained for 7 weeks before being replaced by another local film, Romper Stomper. It was the highest-grossing film in Australia for the year with a gross of A$21,760,400. It grossed US$11,738,022 in the United States and Canada and eventually took A$80 million at the worldwide box office, making it one of the most successful Australian films of all time.

Awards
 1992 – Won AFI Award for Best Achievement in Costume Design, Best Achievement in Editing, Best Achievement in Production Design, Best Actor in Supporting Role (Barry Otto), Best Actress in Supporting Role (Pat Thomson), Best Director, Best Film, Best Screenplay
 1992 – Nominated AFI Award for Best Achievement in Cinematography, Best Achievement in Sound, Best Actor in Lead Role (Paul Mercurio), Best Actress in Lead Role (Tara Morice), Best Actress in Supporting Role (Gia Carides)
 1992 – Won Cannes Film Festival: Award Of The Youth for Foreign Film
 1993 – Won BAFTA Film Award for Best Costume Design, Best Original Film Score, Best Production Design
 1993 – Nominated BAFTA Film Award for Best Actress (Tara Morice), Best Editing, Best Film, Best Adapted Screenplay, Best Sound
 1993 – Nominated Golden Globe Award for Best Motion Picture – Musical or Comedy
 1993 – Won London Critics Circle Film Awards: ALFS Award for Newcomer of the Year (Baz Luhrmann)
 1994 – Nominated' Bogota Film Festival: Golden Precolumbian Circle Award for Best Film
 2013 – Nominated 20/20 Award for Best Supporting Actress (Pat Thomson)
 2013 – Nominated 20/20 Award for Best Original Screenplay (Baz Luhrmann and Craig Pearce)
 2013 – Nominated 20/20 Award for Best Film Editing (Jill Bilcock)
 2013 – Nominated 20/20 Award for Best Original Score (David Hirschfelder)
 2013 – Nominated 20/20 Award for Best Art Direction (Catherine Martin)
 2013 – Nominated 20/20 Award for Best Costume Design (Angus Strathie)

Music

Among the songs featured on the soundtrack are:
 "The Blue Danube" by Johann Strauss II
 New versions of "Love is in the Air" and "Standing In The Rain" by John Paul Young. The film's version of "Love is in the Air" re-entered the Australian charts and became a Top 5 hit, peaking at #4 on the national chart in October 1992.
 A cover version of John Paul Young's "Yesterday's Hero" by Ignatius Jones
 "Perhaps, Perhaps, Perhaps" by Doris Day
 A cover version of Cyndi Lauper's "Time After Time" by Mark Williams and Tara Morice

Both "The Blue Danube" and "Time After Time" were played in the 1984 and 1986 Strictly Ballroom stage productions.

Musical

In May 2011, it was announced that Strictly Ballroom would be adapted into a stage musical and premiere at the Sydney Lyric theatre. It premiered on 12 April 2014. The production moved to Her Majesty's Theatre, Melbourne in January 2015, and the Lyric Theatre, QPAC in Brisbane in September 2015.

The show received its British premiere on 30 November 2016 at the West Yorkshire Playhouse in Leeds. The show had its North American premier in Toronto at the Princess of Wales Theatre on 25 April 2017.

In popular culture
The film has become a staple of pop culture, being referenced in various media worldwide.
 Many television series have episodes with titles referencing the film, including Phenom ("Strictly Lunchroom"), Even Stevens, The Suite Life of Zack & Cody ("Loosely Ballroom") and Groove High ("Slightly Ballroom").
 The film is frequently referenced on the American iteration of Dancing with the Stars, as well as influencing the name of the original UK version Strictly Come Dancing.

See also
 Cinema of Australia
 List of films set in Sydney

References

External links

 
 Strictly Ballroom The Musical
 
 
 
 
 
 Strictly Ballroom at the National Film and Sound Archive
Strictly Ballroom at Oz Movies

1992 films
1990s romantic comedy-drama films
Australian romantic comedy-drama films
1990s Spanish-language films
Films directed by Baz Luhrmann
1990s sports comedy-drama films
Australian films based on plays
Films about dance competitions
Films set in Australia
Films shot in Sydney
Films shot in Melbourne
Ballroom dancing films
Australian sports comedy-drama films
Films scored by David Hirschfelder
Films set in 1967
BAFTA winners (films)
Toronto International Film Festival People's Choice Award winners
1992 directorial debut films
1992 comedy films
1992 drama films
1990s Australian films
1990s English-language films
1990s dance films